is a Japanese footballer who plays as an attacking midfielder for Vissel Kobe.

References

External links

Daiju Sasaki at Eurosport

1999 births
Living people
Japanese footballers
J1 League players
Vissel Kobe players
Sociedade Esportiva Palmeiras players
Japanese expatriate footballers
Japanese expatriate sportspeople in Brazil
Expatriate footballers in Brazil
Association football midfielders